"Give Me Your Love" is the fourth single produced by British DJ and record producer Sigala. It features the vocals from British singer John Newman and partial production work from American electric guitarist Nile Rodgers and was released on 29 April 2016 by Ministry of Sound.

Rodgers plays guitar throughout most of the song. According to the BBC Four documentary "How to Make It in the Music Business", there was one part of the chorus where Newman switched Rodgers' guitar playing for his own, and only got caught when he was playing guitar during playback of the video, and discovered he couldn't quite play the chorus correctly.

Music video
A music video to accompany the release of "Give Me Your Love" was first released onto YouTube on 29 April 2016 at a total length of three minutes and forty-eight seconds.

Track listing

Charts and certifications

Weekly charts

Year-end charts

Certifications

Release history

References

2016 singles
2016 songs
John Newman (singer) songs
Ministry of Sound singles
Tropical house songs
Sigala songs
Songs written by John Newman (singer)
Songs written by Sigala
Number-one singles in Scotland